Salzwedel is a town in Saxony-Anhalt, Germany. It may also refer to:

Places in Germany
Salzwedel station in Salzwedel
Salzwedel–Dannenberg railway, a defunct line between Salzwedel and Dannenberg
Salzwedel Dumme, tributary of the River Jeetzel in Saxony-Anhalt, Germany
Salzwedel-Land, defunct "collective municipality" in Saxony-Anhalt, Germany
Altmarkkreis Salzwedel, district in Saxony-Anhalt, Germany

Surname
Conrad II of Salzwedel (died 1241), German nobleman
Dave Salzwedel (born 1968), American football player
Heiko Salzwedel (1957–2021), German cycling coach
Jack Salzwedel, chairman and CEO of American Family Insurance
Lutgard of Salzwedel (1110–1152), Danish Queen consort
Senno Salzwedel (born 1959), German weightlifter